Allomacrus is a genus of parasitoid wasps belonging to the family Ichneumonidae.

The species of this genus are found in Europe and Northern America.

Species:
 Allomacrus arcticus (Holmgren, 1880) 
 Allomacrus jakuticus Humala, 2002

References

Ichneumonidae
Hymenoptera genera